The Women's 500 m time trial event of the 2015 UCI Track Cycling World Championships was held on 19 February 2015.

Results
The race was started at 19:00.

References

Women's 500 m time trial
UCI Track Cycling World Championships – Women's 500 m time trial